Comic Potential by Alan Ayckbourn is a romantic sci-fi comedy play. It is set in a TV studio in the foreseeable future, when low-cost androids (known as "actoids") have largely replaced actors.

Background

The play was Ayckbourn's second exploration into science fiction, the first being Henceforward... This play originated from the idea that the ability to laugh and the ability to fall in love are both characteristics that differentiate humans from androids, as both are illogical from an objective viewpoint, thus raising the question as to whether either of the actions in an android would be considered a malfunction. The comedy also explores the Pygmalion syndrome and competing desires for autonomy and certainty.

Plot summary

Idealistic young writer Adam Trainsmith meets Chandler Tate, a former director of classic comedies, who makes a living by directing a never-ending soap opera. The leading-role android makes a series of mistakes. Supporting role android JC-F31-333, spots his lapses and laughs.

Later on, while Adam is watching old slapstick comedy, JC-F31-333 laughs again. She is afraid that the sense of humour is a production fault. Adam sees it as an advantage. He nicknames his favourite android Jacie and persuades Chandler that they should make a comedy for her.

Regional TV director Carla Pepperbloom threatens to ruin the project. She is jealous of Adam's sympathy for talented Jacie and orders the android's memory wiped. Adam panics and decides to kidnap Jacie. While on the escape, Adam and Jacie fall in love.

Productions

Comic Potential is Ayckbourn's fifty-third full-length play. It was first performed at the Stephen Joseph Theatre in Scarborough, North Yorkshire in 1998 and received its West End premiere at the Lyric Theatre, Shaftesbury Avenue in October 1999. Chandler Tate was played by David Soul, and Jacie by Janie Dee, who had created the role in Scarborough. Janie's performance won her the Best Actress category of the London Critics' Circle Theatre Awards (1999), the Evening Standard Awards (1999) and the Laurence Olivier Awards (2000).

Awards and nominations 

 Outer Critics Circle Award for Outstanding Off-Broadway Play (nominated)
 Drama Desk Award for Outstanding Play (nominated)
 Laurence Olivier Award for Best Comedy (nominated)

External links 
 Comic Potential on official Ayckbourn site

References 

Plays by Alan Ayckbourn
1998 plays
Science fiction theatre